Notre-Dame de Paris is a ballet by French choreographer Roland Petit. It was premiered by the Paris Opera Ballet in 1967. The ballet is based on Victor Hugo's 1831 novel The Hunchback of Notre Dame. 

It was the first work Roland Petit created for the Paris Opera Ballet, a company he had left 20 years earlier.

This ballet was very successful and continues to be performed to the present, including a series of performances at the Opéra national de Paris at the end of the 2013-2014 season, at the Opera Bastille and a production in 2013 at the Teatro alla Scala in Milan.

 Music  Maurice Jarre
 Libretto  after Victor Hugo
 Sets  René Allio
 Costumes  Yves Saint Laurent

 Original cast
 Esmeralda: Claire Motte
 Quasimodo: Roland Petit
 Frollo: Cyril Atanassoff
 Phoebus: Jean-Pierre Bonnefous

References

 Roland Petit

Compositions by Maurice Jarre
Ballets by Roland Petit
1967 ballet premieres
Works based on The Hunchback of Notre-Dame